Marie Watt (born 1967) is a contemporary artist living and working in Portland, Oregon. Enrolled in the Seneca Nation of Indians, Watt has created work primarily with textile arts and community collaboration centered on diverse Native American themes.

Background
Marie Watt was born in 1967 in Seattle, Washington. She majored in Speech Communications and Art at Willamette University in Salem, Oregon. She also explored museum studies at the Institute of American Indian Arts in Santa Fe. She holds an AFA degree from the Institute of American Indian Arts, a BS degree from Willamette University and an MFA degree in Painting and Printmaking from Yale University. Watt is a member of the Turtle Clan of the Seneca Nation and her father's family were Wyoming ranchers. These two factors in her background have influenced her artwork; Watt describes herself as "half Cowboy and half Indian."

Artwork
Watt works primarily with blankets as a material in her installation and collaborative works. She also prints lithography. For her sculpture and installation, she uses a variety of materials, including everyday objects, as well as textiles, alabaster, slate, and cornhusks. She cites Pop art, Abstract Expressionism, and indigenous visual traditions as sources for her work. Watt had a studio in Portland, Oregon and started experimenting with materials, such as corn husk, then began experimenting with woven blankets. In 2002, her stone sculpture Pedestrian was installed along the east bank of the Willamette River in Portland. Her work has appeared in several exhibitions in the Pacific Northwest.

Watt involves community effort when creating artworks. Her project Blanket Stories: Transportation Object, Generous Ones at the Tacoma Art Museum involved creating large-scale installations out of blankets donated by the community. Not only are the blankets the medium but "Watt believes that blankets provide access to social connections, historical traditions, and cross-cultural meanings." Watt hosts sewing circles, groups who gather and work such as with the piece Forget me not: Mothers and Sons in which they constructed portraits of servicemen (and one woman) from Oregon killed in the Iraqi war.

Career
In September 2004, as part of the Continuum 12 artists series, an exhibit of her work opened in New York City and the George Gustav Heye Center of the National Museum of the American Indian. The exhibit included Blanket Stories, a sculpture made of two towers of wool blankets, with each stack sewn together with a central thread. She collected the blankets over several years, including many Hudson's Bay point blankets that were given to Native Americans in trade by the Hudson's Bay Company during the 19th century.

In 2011, the Bill & Melinda Gates Foundation commissioned Watt to produce a site-specific artwork for their Seattle campus. The work, entitled Blanket Stories: Matriarch, Guardian and Seven Generations, is a 14-foot column of wool blankets from all over the world and is located in the building's lobby. Describing how the materials fit this specific location, Watt wrote, "It's the first column I've made with the explicit goal of collecting and integrating blankets from around the world, echoing the Foundation's global mission; the column will be constructed of reclaimed blankets and reclaimed cedar, in resonance with the campus' goal of attaining LEED Gold certification."

In 2014, 350 people contributed to an outdoor sculpture at Tacoma Art Museum. The towers she made were cast in bronze and she posted a micro-website with stories behind each blanket. Watt listens to her material and pulls from a deep sense of community and narrative to create works with history. Her works are both figurative and abstract.

Watt is currently a professor at Portland Community College, and is the coordinator of its Northview Gallery.

Selected exhibitions 

 Vantage Point: The Contemporary Native Art Collection. National Museum of the American Indian, Smithsonian Institution. (2010)
 Unsuspected Possibilities: Leonardo Drew, Sarah Oppenheimer, and Marie Watt. SITE Santa Fe. (2015)
 Making Knowing: Craft in Art, 1950–2019. Whitney Museum of Art. (2019-2022)
 Indelible Ink: Native Women, Printmaking, Collaboration. University of New Mexico Art Museum. (2020)

Awards and fellowships 

 2005 Eiteljorg Museum Artist Fellowship
 2006 Joan Mitchell Foundation Fellowship
 2007 Anonymous Was A Woman Award
 2009 Bonnie Bronson Fellowship

Notes

External links

KPSU Art Talk interview with Marie Watt
Oregon Art Beat: Sculptor Marie Watt
In Conversation with Marie Watt: A New Coyote Tale

1967 births
Living people
Native American installation artists
Native American printmakers
Artists from Portland, Oregon
Seneca people
Willamette University alumni
Yale School of Art alumni
Institute of American Indian Arts alumni
21st-century Native Americans
American women installation artists
American installation artists
American women printmakers
Portland Community College alumni
Native American women artists
21st-century American women artists
21st-century Native American women